Schillerosaurus was a genus of prehistoric lizard of the Late Jurassic Morrison Formation of Western North America, and is currently the only squamate genus known to be endemic to the Morrison Formation. Described based on a partial skeleton from Dinosaur National Monument by Susan Evans and Dan Chure in 1999 as Schilleria utahensis, its name was subsequently changed to Schillerosaurus due to the former name already being occupied by a modern-day arachnid subgenus. 

Other than it belonging to the infraorder scincomorpha, its further relations are unknown. It is thought to have been an insectivore like most of its modern relatives due to their morphological similarities. Possibly present in stratigraphic zone 5.

See also

 Paleobiota of the Morrison Formation

References

Jurassic lizards
Morrison fauna
Friedrich Schiller